Euphaedra congo is a butterfly in the family Nymphalidae. It is found in the Republic of the Congo and the Democratic Republic of the Congo (Kinshasa).

References

Butterflies described in 1985
congo